Burundi, officially the Republic of Burundi, is a landlocked country in the African Great Lakes region of Southeast Africa, bordered by Rwanda to the north, Tanzania to the east and south and the Democratic Republic of the Congo to the west. Burundi's largest industry is agriculture, which accounted for just over 30% of the GDP. Subsistence agriculture accounts for 90% of agriculture. The nation's largest source of revenue is coffee, which makes up 93% of Burundi's exports. Burundi is one of the world's poorest countries, owing in part to its landlocked geography, poor legal system, lack of economic freedom, lack of access to education, and the proliferation of HIV/AIDS. Approximately 80% of Burundi's population lives in poverty.

Notable firms 
This list includes notable companies with primary headquarters located in the country. The industry and sector follow the Industry Classification Benchmark taxonomy. Organizations which have ceased operations are included and noted as defunct.

See also 
 List of banks in Burundi

References 

Companies of Burundi
Economy of Burundi
 
Burundi